John R. Baltzell (1827–1893) was Mayor of Madison, Wisconsin. He held the office from 1879 to 1880.

References

Mayors of Madison, Wisconsin
1827 births
1893 deaths
19th-century American politicians